Louise Morrison (born 26 June 1980) is a former Australian rugby union player. She was named in Australia's squad for a two-test series against New Zealand in the 2007 Laurie O'Reilly Cup. She made her international debut for the Wallaroos against the Black Ferns at Cooks Gardens in Wanganui.

References 

1980 births
Living people
Australian female rugby union players
Australia women's international rugby union players